Patrik Šorm (born 21 November 1993) is a Czech sprinter specialising in the 400 metres. He won the bronze medal in the 4 × 400 metres relay at the 2015, 2017 European Indoor Championships and silver medal 2021.

International competitions

Personal bests
Outdoor
200 metres – 20.98 (Cheb 2022)
300 metres – 32.49 (Ústí nad Orlicí 2021)
400 metres – 45.41 (Zagreb 2021)
Indoor
200 metres – 21.15 (Prague 2018)
300 metres – 33.26 (Ostrava 2022)
400 metres – 46.25 (Prague 2022)

References

1993 births
Living people
Czech male sprinters
Athletes (track and field) at the 2019 European Games
European Games medalists in athletics
European Games silver medalists for the Czech Republic
Czech Athletics Championships winners
Athletes from Prague
Athletes (track and field) at the 2020 Summer Olympics
Olympic athletes of the Czech Republic